Muchinga is a constituency of the National Assembly of Zambia. It covers the towns of Chibale, Chisomo, Katota, Mukopa, Musoro, Nakosa and Sekeleti in Serenje District of Central Province.

List of MPs

References

Constituencies of the National Assembly of Zambia
Constituencies established in 1962
1962 establishments in Northern Rhodesia